José Borrell (born 4 April 1953) is a Spanish field hockey player. He competed in the men's tournament at the 1972 Summer Olympics.

References

External links
 

1953 births
Living people
Spanish male field hockey players
Olympic field hockey players of Spain
Field hockey players at the 1972 Summer Olympics
Place of birth missing (living people)